White Owls are American-made, machine produced cigars. The logo consists of a snowy owl perched on a cigar. The brand is owned by Swedish Match and was formerly owned by General Cigar Company.

History
White Owl is a cigar that was first produced in 1887. In the 1920s, its Invincible cigar featured an imported Sumatran wrapper. Production was moved from Pennsylvania to Dothan, Alabama in 1985.  The cigars are made with a sheet-type wrapper and binder that encases a mixed filler tobacco blend from five nations.

As of 2011, White Owl cigars imported into Australia are produced in the Dominican Republic, under the direction of an Owensboro, Kentucky, company.

Types
Blunts
Blunts Xtra
Cigarillos
Demi Tip
Mini Sweets 50s
Miniatures 50s
New Yorker
New Yorker 100s
Ranger 120s
Invincible
Sport

References

Cigar brands
1887 introductions